Terataner is an African genus of arboreal ants in the subfamily Myrmicinae.

Distribution
The genus is can be separated into two groups based on distribution and behavior. Both groups are known from the Afrotropics, with the west African group nesting in rotten parts of standing trees, often high above the ground. The other group, consisting of species from east Africa, Madagascar and one from South Africa, nests in cavities of plants near the ground.

Species
Terataner alluaudi (Emery, 1895)
Terataner balrog (Hita, 2017)
Terataner bottegoi (Emery, 1896)
Terataner elegans Bernard, 1953
Terataner foreli (Emery, 1899)
Terataner luteus (Emery, 1899)
Terataner piceus Menozzi, 1942
Terataner rufipes Emery, 1912
Terataner scotti (Forel, 1912)
Terataner steinheili (Forel, 1895)
Terataner transvaalensis Arnold, 1952
Terataner velatus Bolton, 1981
Terataner xaltus Bolton, 1981

References

External links

Myrmicinae
Ant genera
Hymenoptera of Africa